Bradina aulacodialis is a moth of the family Crambidae described by Embrik Strand in 1919. It is found in Taiwan.

References

Moths described in 1919
Bradina